North Clifton is a village and civil parish about 12 miles north of Newark-on-Trent, in the Newark and Sherwood district, in the county of Nottinghamshire, England. In 2011, the parish had a population of 216. The parish touches Thorney, Fledborough, Newton on Trent, South Clifton and Ragnall.

Features 
North Clifton has a church called St George which is Grade II* Listed. North Clifton Primary School is on Church Lane. Clifton-on-Trent railway station opened in 1897 and closed to passengers in 1955 and entirely in 1964. There are four listed buildings in North Clifton.

History 
The name "Clifton" means 'Cliff farm/settlement'. North and South Clifton were recorded in the Domesday Book as Cliftone/Cliftune/Cli(s)tone. Alternative names for North Clifton are "Clifton" and "Clifton North". North Clifton parish also included the townships of South Clifton, Harby and Spalford which became separate parishes in 1866.

North Clifton is a small village on the east bank of the Trent, 12½ miles north by east of Newark, near a long cliff, in which numerous fragments of urns, bones and scalps have been found, near the spot which is supposed to have been anciently occupied by a castle. The church, dedicated to St George, stands on an eminence between North and South Clifton, and was re-pewed in 1831. The vicarage, valued in the King's books at £7 6s, and now at £176, is enjoyed by the Rev. Frederick Parry Hodges D. D. The Rev. G.C. Gordon M.A. is the curate, and resides at the Vicarage House, South Clifton. The prebendary of North Clifton, in Lincoln Cathedral, is the patron and appropriator."

References 

Villages in Nottinghamshire
Civil parishes in Nottinghamshire
Newark and Sherwood